Chun Cheung is one of the 40 constituencies in the Kwun Tong District.

Created for the 2019 District Council elections, the constituency returns one district councillor to the Kwun Tong District Council, with an election every four years.

Chun Cheung loosely covers part of the residential estates Ko Cheung Court and Ko Chun Court in Yau Tong. It has projected population of 17,214.

Councillors represented

Election results

2010s

References

Yau Tong
Constituencies of Hong Kong
Constituencies of Kwun Tong District Council
2019 establishments in Hong Kong
Constituencies established in 2019